Cumnock Academy was a secondary school in Cumnock, East Ayrshire, Scotland.

Notable former pupils include Iona McDonald, Lord Lieutenant of Ayrshire and Arran since 2017; Bill Grant, MP for Ayr, Carrick and Cumnock; and Eric Caldow, a former Scottish international footballer.

Cumnock Academy closed in October 2020 following a merger with nearby Auckinleck Academy to form the new Robert Burns Academy in Cumnock.

References

Cumnock
Secondary schools in East Ayrshire